Wellington Moreira Franco  (born October 19, 1944) is a Brazilian politician who served as the 54th Governor of Rio de Janeiro from 1987 to 1991 and Minister of Mines and Energy in 2018. He is a member of the Brazilian Democratic Movement (MDB).

A native of Teresina, Piauí, Franco taught Sociology at Fluminense Federal University. Installed as the 48th Mayor of Niterói in 1977, he retained the office until 1982. Franco served as a Federal Deputy from Rio de Janeiro, Minister of Strategic Affairs, Minister for Civil Aviation, Secretary of the Investment and Partnership Program and Secretary-General of the Presidency. On March 21, 2019, he was arrested on corruption charges alongside former President Michel Temer.

References

|-

|-

|-

|-

|-

Brazilian sociologists
Governors of Rio de Janeiro (state)
1944 births
Living people
Mayors of places in Brazil
People from Teresina
Brazilian Democratic Movement politicians
Energy ministers of Brazil